The Catholic Church in Cameroon is part of the worldwide Catholic Church, under the spiritual leadership of the Pope in Rome.

There are almost ten million Catholics in the Republic of Cameroon, 38.4% of the population, in 24 Dioceses. There are 1,350 priests and 2,600 men and women in religious orders.

Structure
Within Cameroon the church organization consists of:
Bamenda
 Buéa
 Kumba
 Kumbo
 Mamfe
Bertoua
 Batouri
 Doumé–Abong' Mbang
 Yokadouma
Douala
 Bafang
 Bafoussam
 Edéa
 Eséka
 Nkongsamba
Garoua
 Maroua–Mokolo
 Ngaoundéré
 Yagoua
Yaoundé
 Bafia
 Ebolowa
 Kribi
 Mbalmayo
 Obala
 Sangmélima

References

 
Cameroon
Cameroon